Robert McAlpin Williamson (1804? – December 22, 1859) was a Republic of Texas Supreme Court Justice, state lawmaker and Texas Ranger.  Williamson County, Texas is named for him. He is the first white person documented playing the banjo.

Early life
Williamson was born in Wilkes County, Georgia to a prestigious family.  His mother died shortly after and he was raised by his paternal grandmother, Sarah Gilliam, in Milledgeville, Georgia.  At the age of fifteen, he contracted tuberculous arthritis that caused his right leg to permanently stiffen at a 90-degree angle.  In order to walk, a wooden leg had to be fastened to his knee.  Because of this, he later acquired the nickname "Three-Legged-Willie".  He passed the bar at the approximate age of nineteen before practicing one year of law in Georgia.

Life in Texas
Williamson came to Stephen F. Austin's colony (San Felipe de Austin) in June 1827. He became acquainted with both Stephen F. Austin and William B. Travis during this time.  He co-founded the newspaper The Cotton Plant in 1829 and became the first prosecuting attorney for San Felipe shortly after.  He later went on to edit the newspapers The Texas Gazette and The Mexican Citizen.

He was made the first Major of all the Rangers on November 28, in the Texas Rangers in 1835 and went on to participate in the Texas Revolution fighting in the Battle of Gonzales and the Battle of San Jacinto in William H. Smith's 2nd REG. "J" cavalry.

Political activity

 1833 – Delegate to Convention of 1833
 1835 – Delegate to Consultation (Texas)
 1837 to 1840 – Justice of Texas Republic Supreme Court
 1840 to 1843 – Texas Republic House of Representatives
 1843 to 1844 – Texas Republic Senate
 1843 to 1844 – Texas Republic House of Representatives
 1846 to 1848 – Texas State Senate
 1849 – Unsuccessfully ran for U.S. Representative from Texas,
 1851 – Unsuccessfully ran for Lieutenant Governor of Texas

Death and burial

Williamson died in Wharton County, Texas on December 22, 1859 after a long illness.  He is buried in the Texas State Cemetery.

See also
 Statue of Robert McAlpin Williamson

References

External links
 
 Robert McAlpin Williamson at the Tarlton Law Library – University of Texas Law School
 Three-Legged-Willie.org – Williamson County Texas Genealogy Website

1804 births
1859 deaths
Members of the Texas Ranger Division
Justices of the Texas Supreme Court
People from Wilkes County, Georgia
Members of the Texas House of Representatives
Texas state senators
People of the Texas Revolution
Burials at Texas State Cemetery
Williamson County, Texas
People from Milledgeville, Georgia
19th-century American politicians
19th-century American judges